Ambalasoa is a rural municipality in Madagascar. It belongs to the district of Betroka, which is a part of Anosy Region. The population of the municipality was 5337 in 2018.

Only primary schooling is available. The majority 95% of the population of the commune are farmers, while an additional 3% receives their livelihood from raising livestock. The most important crop is rice, while other important products are peanuts, beans and cassava. Services provide employment for 2% of the population.

References 

Populated places in Anosy